Jeff Dolven is an American academic and poet. He is a professor of English at Princeton University, and the author of four books, one of which is a collection of his poems, and one of which was written in twenty-four hours.

Career
Dolven graduated from Yale University, where he earned a bachelor's degree in philosophy. He was a Rhodes scholar at the University of Oxford, earned a PhD in English from Yale, and was a junior fellow at the Harvard Society of Fellows. He taught for a year at Brandeis University as a visiting assistant professor and joined the faculty at Princeton in 2001. At Princeton he has served as Behrman Professor of the Humanities and Acting Chair of the Department of English, and was the founding director of the Interdisciplinary Doctoral Program in the Humanities. He is also an editor at large at Cabinet magazine.

Dolven has also received fellowships from the American Council of Learned Societies, the Stanford Humanities Center, the American Philosophical Society, and the Guggenheim Foundation, and has been a fellow at the MacDowell Colony and Trinity College, Cambridge.

Works

Dolven, Jeff (2018). Take Care. Brooklyn, New York, U.S.: Cabinet Books, 2017. . OCLC 999606053.

References

Living people
Yale College alumni
American Rhodes Scholars
Princeton University faculty
American literary theorists
20th-century American poets
21st-century American poets
American male poets
20th-century American male writers
21st-century American male writers
Year of birth missing (living people)